Wang Han (born 7 April 1974), is a Chinese television variety show host.

Music Works
Play Boy — Released in 2006

Movie Works
Almost Perfect  — (Released in 2008)

Television Works

Filmography

Film

Book

Awards
 2004: The yearly national best entertainment variety show host award 
 2004: The best entertainment show host of China award
 2006: The yearly most excellent host award
 2006: The 6th Jin Ying Festival—China's excellent TV host award
 2007: The new weekly TV list—The yearly most outstanding entertainment show host award

Personal life 
In early 2010, Wang Han revealed the relationship with a Chinese hostess . On November 19, 2014, his son was born and nicknamed Xiao Suancai.

References

External links

Chinese television presenters
Chinese game show hosts
People from Suzhou
Living people
1974 births